Rudolf Bester (born 19 July 1983) is a retired Namibian professional football forward who last played for Alexandra Black Aces.

Career
He previously played for Serbian SuperLiga club FK Čukarički, having joined the team in January 2008 from Eleven Arrows.

He was a part of the Namibian squad at the 2008 African Cup of Nations. He has a record of 13 goals for Namibia and is currently the highest national top goal scorer, ahead of retired Gerros Uri-khob with 12 and Ruben Van Wyk with 11 goals. Despite coming on for Orlando Pirates as a substitute in various games, Bester once gave Pirates an important victory in the last games of the 2011/12 league season. The win came at a crucial time and contributed to the team's league title. Pirates were held 1–1 by Cosmos and in the dying minutes of the second half, he scored a winning cracker to give the defending champions a 3-point lead on top of the table against relegation bound Jomo Cosmos in the 2011/12 season.

In June 2012 Bester missed three important international matches due to Injury. He was expected to play for Namibia's Brave Warriors in the 2014 Brazil World Cup Qualifiers against Nigeria, Kenya and 2013 African Cup of Nations qualifier against Liberia. He recovered from the injury and returned to international duty in a friendly against Rwanda on Saturday, 13 October 2012 in Windhoek. He is one of the few Namibians to play professional football outside Namibia, the first Namibian to win the PSL with Pirates and the first Namibian to play against Tottenham Hotspur of England.

His name is occasionally spelled as Rudolph in some sources.

Honours
Premier Soccer League (1):
2011-12
MTN 8 (1):
2011
Telkom Knockout Cup (1):
2011

International goals
Scores and results list Namibia's goal tally first.

References

External links
 
 

1983 births
Living people
People from Otjiwarongo
Namibian men's footballers
Namibia international footballers
Namibian expatriate footballers
Association football forwards
Eleven Arrows F.C. players
FK Čukarički players
Serbian SuperLiga players
Namibian expatriate sportspeople in Serbia
Maritzburg United F.C. players
Orlando Pirates F.C. players
blue Waters F.C. players
2008 Africa Cup of Nations players
Expatriate footballers in Serbia
Expatriate soccer players in South Africa
Namibian expatriate sportspeople in South Africa
Lamontville Golden Arrows F.C. players
Free State Stars F.C. players
Moroka Swallows F.C. players